Nacon (formerly Bigben Interactive) is a French video game company based in Lesquin. It designs and distributes gaming accessories, and publishes and distributes video games for various platforms. In 2020 Bigben Group was consolidated to form Nacon. Bigben Interactive was established in 1981.

History 
In 2001, the company reached an agreement with Sega to distribute the remaining stock of Sega's Dreamcast consoles, accessories and software across Europe. 
In December 2016, three years after Atari's initial bankruptcy sale, Atari sold the Test Drive franchise to Bigben Interactive. The V-Rally series was also sold to Bigben Interactive around this time without a formal announcement.
Through 2020, Bigben Interactive was subsidiary of the Bigben Group, which also oversaw Nacon, its video game accessory company. On 11 February 2020, the parent company announced they were merging Bigben Interactive and Nacon into a single entity to go as Nacon. In January 2021, Nacon announced that it had acquired Australian video game developer Big Ant Studios. On 1 March 2021, video game developer Frogwares alleged Nacon illegally hacked and published a pirated version of their game, The Sinking City, on Steam in February 2021 during an ongoing distribution dispute between the two companies. In August 2021, Nacon acquired Crea-ture Studios. In October 2021, Nacon acquired Ishtar Games. In February 2022, Nacon acquired Midgar Studio. Nacon announced its intent to acquire Daedalic Entertainment for an estimated  in February 2022, with the deal concluding in April 2022. In May 2022 Nacon announced the formation of Nacon Studio Milan, encompassing its October 2020 acquisition RaceWard Studio, as well as other yet to be named studios.

Studios

Games published

Under dispute 
The rights for the following titles are disputed, with Frogwares claiming Nacon only owns the distribution rights:

References

Further reading

External links 
 
  (corporate)

 
Companies based in Hauts-de-France
French companies established in 1981
Video game companies established in 1981
Video game companies of France
Video game publishers
Companies listed on Euronext Paris
2020 initial public offerings